Jakov Fak (born 1 August 1987) is a Croatian biathlete competing for Slovenia since 2010. As a member of the Croatian biathlon team, Fak won bronze medals at the 2009 World Championships and at the 2010 Winter Olympics, where he was also the Croatian flag bearer at the opening ceremony. In 2010, Fak switched his citizenship and started competing for Slovenia. Fak won four medals at the World Championships with the Slovenian team, including two gold and a silver medal at the 2018 Winter Olympics. In addition, Fak has eight victories in the World Cup.

Career
Fak began to compete in biathlon in 2001 under the trainer Robert Petrović. His first international biathlon tournament was the Junior World Championships in Ridnaun in 2002, where his best result was 64th place in the Sprint event. Fak improved his performance in 2008, finishing in the top 10 at that year's Junior World Championships.

Since 2006, Fak has participated in the Biathlon World Cup. In his first race in the World Cup in Hochfilzen, Fak finished 107th. For a long time, his best performance was 47th place which he reached in an Individual race in 2007 in Pokljuka. In 2007 he also participated in his first Biathlon World Championships, finishing 78th in the Sprint race and 93rd in the Individual.

The big breakthrough in Fak's career came in the 2008/09 season. In the opening race of the season, Fak came in 47th, but in the Individual, he earned his first World cup points with a 38th position finish. In the third World Cup stage in Hochfilzen, Fak achieved a 16th-place finish.

2009 Biathlon World Championships
Despite several respectable performances in the World Cup, Fak's performance at the Biathlon World Championships 2009 came as a huge surprise. In the opening sprint race, Fak improved his career-best performance by two more places, finishing 14th. However, he couldn't improve that performance in the pursuit falling back to 25th place. The big surprise came in the 20 kilometres individual race, where Fak won the bronze medal. A perfect score in the final range would have brought Fak a gold medal; however, after one miss, Fak had to battle very hard for at least some medal and, in the end, beat Simon Fourcade by less than a second to win the bronze. Thus Jakov Fak won Croatia their first-ever World Championship medal in biathlon.

2010 Winter Olympics

After his success in the World Championships, the expectations were high, but Fak's World Cup race performances in the 2009–10 season were substandard. He managed to win his first points in the World Cup only on 23 January 2010, with a 24th place in Antholz, and was largely forgotten by the public by that time.
At the 2010 Winter Olympics in Vancouver, Fak once again created a sensation by winning the bronze medal in the 10 km sprint.

Switch of Citizenship
In July 2010, it was announced in the Slovenian Press that Fak would represent Slovenia in an international competition. On 19 November, the switch to the Slovenian Biatlethe team was officially announced and Fak received his Slovenian passport on 24 November, enabling him to compete for Slovenia.

Career threatening injury
At the world cup races in the US in 2011, which were held in freezing temperatures, Jakov Fak suffered 3rd-degree frostbite to his trigger finger. It was feared his finger might have to be amputated which would certainly have ended his career as a biathlete. Jakov and his coaches decided to pull out of the Biathlon World Championships 2011 in Russia to focus on recovering from his injury and saving his finger.

2012 Biathlon World Championships
After missing the 2011 World Championship due to the injury, Fak entered the 2012 World Championship as a member of the Slovenian team. He won two medals, a silver in the mixed relay (together with Andreja Mali, Teja Gregorin, and Klemen Bauer).
Although Slovenia crossed the finish line as first, 8.2 seconds in front of Norway, the jury awarded bonus seconds to the Scandinavians because one target did not go down despite their last runner Ole Einar Bjørndalen hitting it and therefore had to take an additional penalty loop, which put them ahead of Slovenia into the first place. A couple of days later, Fak won the gold medal at the 20 km individual, thus winning the first gold medal for Slovenia at World Championships.

Biathlon results
All results are sourced from the International Biathlon Union.

Olympic Games
2 medals (1 silver, 1 bronze)

*The mixed relay was added as an event in 2014.

World Championships
5 medals (2 gold, 1 silver, 2 bronze)

*During Olympic seasons, competitions are only held for those events not included in the Olympic program.
**The single mixed relay was added as an event in 2019.

Individual victories
8 victories (1 In, 3 Sp, 2 Pu, 2 MS)

*Results are from UIPMB and IBU races which include the Biathlon World Cup, Biathlon World Championships and the Winter Olympic Games.

References

External links

 
 Croatian Biathlon Association 
 Fak: Moj životni san se ispunio već ove godine  
 
 
 
 

1987 births
Living people
Slovenian people of Croatian descent
Sportspeople from Rijeka
Croatian male biathletes
Slovenian male biathletes
Biathletes at the 2010 Winter Olympics
Biathletes at the 2014 Winter Olympics
Biathletes at the 2018 Winter Olympics
Biathletes at the 2022 Winter Olympics
Olympic biathletes of Croatia
Olympic biathletes of Slovenia
Medalists at the 2010 Winter Olympics
Olympic medalists in biathlon
Olympic bronze medalists for Croatia
Medalists at the 2018 Winter Olympics
Olympic silver medalists for Slovenia
Biathlon World Championships medalists
Holmenkollen Ski Festival winners
Naturalized citizens of Slovenia